Sufian District is in Shabestar County, East Azerbaijan province, Iran. At the 2006 National Census, its population was 38,767 in 10,043 households. The following census in 2011 counted 36,235 people in 10,698 households. At the latest census in 2016, the district had 37,646 inhabitants in 12,083 households.

References 

Shabestar County

Districts of East Azerbaijan Province

Populated places in East Azerbaijan Province

Populated places in Shabestar County